Nadia Al Najjar is an Emirati writer who published five short stories including "The Speckled Tiger", "I Am Different"; and three novels including "Cities of Passion" which won the first place in the Emirates Award for Fiction in the Short Fiction category in 2015. Her novel "Trio D" won the award for the Best Emirati Book by an Emirati Creative Writer at the Sharjah International Book Fair.

Education and career 
Nadia Al Najjar was born in the United Arab Emirates and currently lives in Dubai. She holds a Bachelor's degree in Computer Sciences from the University of Ajman of Science and Technology.

She has published five short stories for children including "I Am Different", "My Wondrous Picnic With My Uncle Salem" and "Voices of the World". In 2014, she published her first novel "Mafa Al Thekrayat". A year later, she published her second novel "Cities of Passion" which won the first place in "Best Short Novel" of the Emirates Award for Fiction. Whereas, her novel "Trio D" won the award for the best Emirati Creative Writer at the Sharjah International Book Fair in 2017. Her short story "The Speckled Tiger" had been included in the UAE's Arabic Curriculum. In 2017, Al Najjar's short story "My Wondrous Picnic With My Uncle Salem" was shortlisted for category of Children's Literature of the Sheikh Zayed Book Award. She has participated in many literary events and festivals including the Emirates Airline Festival of Literature in 2018 and Abu Dhabi International Book Fair.

Works

Novels 

 Manfa Al Thekrayat, 2014
 "Cities of Passion" (Original title: Madaa’n Al Lahfa), 2015
 "Trio D"  (Original title: Thulathiat Al Dal), 2017

Short stories 

 "I Am Different" (Original title: Ana Mokhtalef), 2017
 "The Speckled Tiger" (Original title: Al Namir Al Alrqat), 2017
 "Voices of the World" (Original title: Aswat Al A’lam), 2018
 "My Wondrous Picnic with Uncle Salem" (Original title: Nozhati Al Ajeeba Ma’aa Al A’am Salem), 2019
 Ghaftan, 2019

Awards 
 2015: Al Najjar's Novel "The Cities of Passions" won the first place in the Emirates Award for Fiction in the Short Fiction category.
 2017: Her novel "Trio D" won the award for the best Emirati Book by an Emirati Creative Writer at the Sharjah International Book Fair.

See also 

 Lateefa Buti
 Hessa Al Muhairi
 Salha Obeid
 Maryam Saqer Al Qasimi

References 

21st-century Emirati women writers
21st-century short story writers
21st-century novelists
Year of birth missing (living people)
Living people